Calosoma simplex is a species of ground beetle in the subfamily Carabinae. It was described by John Lawrence LeConte in 1878.

References

simplex
Beetles described in 1878